Anton Šťastný (born August 5, 1959) is a Slovak former professional ice hockey left winger who played nine seasons with the Quebec Nordiques of the National Hockey League (NHL) from 1980 until 1989. He was the first player born and trained in Slovakia to be drafted by an NHL team. He is the brother of Vladimír, Bohumil, Eva, Marián, and Peter Šťastný, and the uncle of Yan Stastny and Paul Stastny (both Peter's sons), all of whom have been involved in ice hockey at a professional level. Anton's son, Thomas Šťastný, played in Switzerland, last for Martigny in 2015.

Playing career
Šťastný was originally drafted 198th overall by the Philadelphia Flyers in the 1978 NHL Amateur Draft, but the selection was ruled invalid after it was determined Šťastný was too young to be drafted. He re-entered and was drafted 83rd overall by the Nordiques in the 1979 NHL Entry Draft. He played 650 career NHL games, scoring 252 goals and 384 assists for 636 points and scored at least 25 goals in eight consecutive seasons.

He played his first nine seasons alongside his brother Peter, four of which were also played alongside Marián. They were the third trio of brothers to play on the same professional hockey team (the first being the Bentley brothers of the Chicago Blackhawks in the 1940s and the second being the Plager brothers of the St. Louis Blues in the 1970s). He ranks ninth overall in NHL points by a Slovak player. Anton and Peter share the rookie record for points in a game, with 8, which they accomplished in the same game against the Washington Capitals on February 22, 1981. Two days earlier, they each recorded six points against the Vancouver Canucks. These two games, played two days apart, are four out of the nine total instances in which rookies have recorded at least 6 points in a game.

Personal life
Anton was born in Bratislava, the fifth son of Stanislav and Frantiska. His two older brothers, Vladimir (born 1945) and Bohumil (born 1947) were born when the family still lived in the village of Pružina, about 170 kilometres northeast of Bratislava. They moved to Bratislava before the birth of Marián (1953), Peter (1956), and Eva (1966). Stanislav worked for a state-run company that built hydro-electric dams until 1980 when he retired, and mainly dealt with managing inventory. Frantiska stayed at home and raised the children.

Career statistics

Regular season and playoffs

International

See also 
Notable families in the NHL
List of Slovaks in the NHL
List of players with eight or more points in an NHL game

References

Bibliography

External links
 

1959 births
Living people
Czechoslovak defectors
Czechoslovak ice hockey left wingers
EHC Olten players
Halifax Citadels players
HC Fribourg-Gottéron players
HC Slovan Bratislava players
Ice hockey players at the 1980 Winter Olympics
Olympic ice hockey players of Czechoslovakia
Philadelphia Flyers draft picks
Quebec Nordiques draft picks
Quebec Nordiques players
Slovak ice hockey left wingers
Ice hockey people from Bratislava
Canadian ice hockey left wingers
Czechoslovak emigrants to Canada
Canadian expatriate ice hockey players in Switzerland
Czechoslovak expatriate sportspeople in Switzerland